Konganeeswarar Temple is a Hindu temple situated on West Main Street, Thanjavur. The principal deity is Konganeeswarar and his consorts Gnanambal and Annapoorani. The temple is associated with the saint Kongana Siddhar.

References 

 

Hindu temples in Thanjavur